Stružāni Parish is an administrative unit of Rēzekne Municipality, Latvia.

Towns, villages and settlements of Stružāni parish 
  - parish administrative center

References 

Parishes of Latvia
Rēzekne Municipality